The Citroën AX is a supermini which was built by the French manufacturer Citroën from 1986 to 1998. It was launched at the 1986 Paris Motor Show to replace the Citroën Visa and Citroën LNA.

Overview

Development of this model started in 1983, and was initially also going to form the basis of a sister model from Talbot to replace the Samba; however, the falling popularity of the Talbot brand - coupled with the huge success of the new Peugeot 205 - had led to Peugeot deciding to axe it by the time the Citroën AX was launched, and so the Talbot version never made it into production.

The car was available on the left-hand drive continental markets from its launch on 2 October 1986, as a three-door hatchback with 1.0, 1.1 and 1.4-litre TU-series belt driven OHC engines. A range of five-door models was added in 1987 and a 1.4-litre diesel engine was introduced in 1988. The latter was replaced by a 1.5-litre unit in September 1994. The right-hand drive version for the UK market was launched in August 1987, initially only as a three-door hatchback, with a five-door version joining the range a year later, effectively replacing the five-door Citroën Visa, which was discontinued that year. With the final demise of the classic Citroën 2CV in 1990, the AX became the smallest model in the Citroën range. The very earliest cars had an issue with gear shifters falling off; this was rectified by the time the AX reached export markets. It was initially backed by a memorable television advertising campaign filmed in China, starring actress Janet Mas and an elderly gentleman, whose character was simply known as Mr. Wong.

This was due to the extensive use of plastic panels in non-load bearing areas and varying the thicknesses of steel in the bodyshell to be the minimum needed to take required loads. Another target for the engineers was lowering friction in the engines. The AX has fully independent suspension with unusually long wheel travel.

It also optionally used self-coloured plastic bumpers. This technology came from the PSA Peugeot-Citroën / Renault / French government ECO 2000 project. The production version was much more conservative than the original 'one box' design prototype, that was closer to the Eco 2000 styling after negative reactions in focus groups. The "one-box" city car eventually came to market with the Renault Twingo, launched in 1992.

Also available was a 4x4 variant, but with limited success when compared to the rival Fiat Panda 4x4. The AX 4x4 was only available with five doors and was not sold in the United Kingdom.

The first performance version was the limited-run AX Sport from 1987, with a 1.3 engine and twin carburettors producing , wearing iconic white steel wheels (5,5" x 13") which resembled those on its brother, the Peugeot 205 Rallye. The AX Sport used Solex ADDHE 40 carburettors until late 1988 and was then replaced with Weber DCOM 40s, just like the 205 Rallye 1,3. The AX Sport had a shorter inlet manifold than the 205 Rallye, to save room in the smaller engine compartment. In phase 2 guise the Sport was available in other colours and with optional GT wheels and rear spoiler.

Later, the AX 14GT, with a single-carburettor  1.4 engine also found in the Peugeot 205 XS, was introduced. From 1991, this model utilised fuel injection to coincide with the revamp of the entire range and to coincide with tougher 1992 EU emission regulations that introduced exhaust catalytic converters.

Facelift

Late 1991 saw the range revised, with a heavily facelifted tailgate and interior being the most notable changes. The front turn signals were now clear, and the Citroën logo was moved to the center of the bonnet. The much maligned dashboard was replaced by a more conservative design.

The following year saw the introduction of the most powerful AX variant, the  GTi. The GT was sold alongside the GTi for a few months, but was eventually phased out. New models were also introduced, such as the Forte, Spree, Elation and Dimension.

Its closest competitor, the Peugeot 106 Ski, (that shared components with the AX), was outsold by the Echo. 

In November 1995 (model year 96), the AX Électrique was introduced. It was available as a four-seater passenger car, but was sold mainly to administrations, for which it was offered as a two-seater LCV model. Some pre-production vehicles have been on the road since December 1993, notably in La Rochelle. The AX Électrique was equipped with a 20 kW engine with a maximum speed of 91 km/h. The traction battery is composed of 20 nickel-cadmium monoblocks. The AX Électrique can reach 50 km/h in 8.3 seconds. Citroën reported an estimated urban range of 75 km. The vehicle weighs 995 kg (980 kg for the LCV versions, stripped of their rear seats).

From June 1996, following the introduction of the Saxo, the range was slimmed-down, with production of the AX ending in December 1998, after a 12-year production run. In May 1997, the production of the AX in Vigo, Spain, ended after 812,000 vehicles produced in the factory. The assembly of the model was maintained in Mangualde, Portugal for some months. It had been withdrawn from the UK market during the first half of 1997, following the demise of right-hand drive production. A total of 2,425,138 AXs were produced.

The Peugeot 106 (launched in 1991) and Citroën Saxo were both developments of the AX. They followed the 1990s trend for heavier, more solid and 'safer' feeling cars that continues today. The AX was designed for lightness, with a 'less is more' philosophy, but with more conventional styling than previous Citroëns.

Derivatives

In 1996, the EV3 engine (air engine) was mounted into a regular Citroën AX car by MDI. Heuliez presented an estate version called the AX Evasion at the 1988 Mondial de l'Automobile.

Besides the well known versions that are documented Citroën also produced a few rare variants.

Citroën also built a concept car named Xanthia based on the AX.

Citroën produced a number of 374 AX Electriques starting December 1993 to 1996.

The Citroën AX BB Cabrio was a small roadster derived from the AX (1988). In Portugal, Citroën dealership Benjamin Barral from Amadora in Lisbon created an unofficial convertible version in the 1980s until about 1996 called the BB AX Cabrio, originally powered by the twin-choke carb AX GT 1.4 L engine, but later available with any type of engine that equipped the 3 door AX.

At one stage, parent firm PSA Peugeot Citroën had planned to launch a Talbot Samba replacement as a version of the AX with a different grille and a Talbot badge, but this plan was cancelled, as the entire Talbot marque was axed on passenger cars by 1987 following several years of declining sales.

Automobiles Citroën also launched the AX Pistes Rouges 4WD 1400 model, based on the standard three-door AX GT 1360cc engine but with a unique four-wheel-drive system developed and produced by the French Dangel company for between 1992 and 1994.

Malaysian car company Proton produced a version of the Citroën AX, the Proton Tiara, from 1996 to 2000.

Mega Club/Ranch
Aixam Mega at one time built an AX derivative called Mega Club and Mega Ranch. It was somewhat inspired by the Méhari, with a plastic bodywork and an optional convertible version, with two-wheel drive or four-wheel drive. It was discontinued in 1998, after nearly 1,000 had been built. A competition version of the Mega Club with a tubeframe chassis raced in the Andros Trophy in the early 1990, but powered by Ford and Honda engines.

Models

References

External links

1990s cars
All-wheel-drive vehicles
Cars introduced in 1986
AX
City cars
Front-wheel-drive vehicles
Hatchbacks
Electric cars
Cars discontinued in 1998